Yun Wang (born 1964) is a poet and cosmologist. She is originally from Gaoping, a small town near Zunyi, in Guizhou Province, China.

Professional work in astrophysics

Yun Wang received a bachelor's degree in physics from Tsinghua University in Beijing, after which she came to the United States and obtained her master's and doctorate (also in physics) from Carnegie Mellon University.  A Senior Research Scientist at California Institute of Technology since 2015, and a Professor in the University of Oklahoma's Department of Physics and Astronomy until 2017, she has published over 100 refereed papers, most recently specializing on probing the dark energy in the Universe, with particular attention to the use of supernovae and galaxy redshift surveys as cosmological probes, studies of the cosmic microwave background anisotropy,  and the measurement of cosmological parameters.

Yun Wang has developed strategies for optimizing future surveys to probe dark energy, and created a mission concept for the NASA-DOE Joint Dark Energy Mission (JDEM),  the Joint Efficient Dark-energy Investigation (JEDI), and served as the Principal Investigator of JEDI. The JEDI/JDEM mission concept illustrates the extraordinary efficiency achievable through innovative instrumentation, and the great scientific advantages of combining three independent observational methods (galaxy clustering, weak lensing, and supernovae) to probe dark energy. JEDI has significantly impacted the design of space missions to probe dark energy.

Yun Wang was elected a Fellow of the American Physical Society in 2012, with the citation:
"For her leadership in dark energy research, especially in developing a robust and consistent framework for analysing and interpreting cosmological data to place model-independent constraints on dark energy, and in optimizing the science return of planned space missions to probe dark energy"
(from http://www.aps.org/programs/honors/fellowships/archive-all.cfm?initial=W&year=2012&unit_id=DAP&institution=)

Yun Wang is the PI of ATLAS Probe, a mission concept for a NASA probe-class space mission. ATLAS Probe will map the cosmic web of dark matter, and decode the physics of galaxy evolution. It will also provide definitive measurements on dark energy, explore dusty regions of the Inner Milky Way, and probe the formation history of the Outer Solar System. Yun Wang is also the PI of the space mission ISCEA (Infrared SmallSat for Cluster Evolution Astrophysics), selected by NASA in September 2018 for a mission concept study.

Her technical monograph "Dark Energy" was published by Wiley in 2010.

Her six most-cited recent papers are the following (with citations from INSPIRE-HEP):
  (Times Cited: 322)
 (Times Cited: 274)
 (Times Cited: 272)
 (Times Cited: 210)
  (Times Cited: 201)
 (Times Cited:202)

Poetry

Books
 The Book of Mirrors, White Pine Press, 2021, Winner of the Twenty-Sixth White Pine Press Poetry Prize
 Dreaming of Fallen Blossoms: Tune Poems of Su Dong-Po (Translations, Chinese/English bilingual), White Pine Press, 2019
 The Book of Totality,  Salmon Poetry Press, 2015
 The Book of Jade, Story Line Press, 2002; Winner of the Fifteenth Nicklas Roerich Poetry Prize

Chapbooks
 The Carp, Bull Thistle Press, 1994
 Horse by the Mountain Stream, Word Palace Press, 2016.

References

General references
 The Quest for Dark Energy:High Road or Low? Science (magazine), VOL 309 2 September 2005 p. 1483
New Data on 2 Doomsday Ideas, Big Rip vs. Big Crunch by James Glantz, New York Times, February 21, 2004
Cosmic Doomsday Delayed by Mark Peplow Nature, no. 41101, 2004 (subscription required)
 ESI Special Topic: Cosmic Microwave Background Radiation Interview with Prof. Yun Wang and Prof. Max Tegmark  (April 2007)
 Review of The Carp, Bloomsbury Review, March-April, 1997, p. 15.
 Review of The Book of Jade, Patricia Monaghan, Booklist, December 1, 2002, p. 643.
 Review of The Book of Totality, Kevin McLaughlin, Better Than Starbucks magazine, May 2018.
 Review of Dreaming of Fallen Blossoms: Tune Poems of Su Dong-Po, Kevin McLaughlin, Better Than Starbucks magazine, May 2019. 
 "The Blossoming of Yun Wang", Richard Jarrett, Voice magazine, October 30, 2020 issue, Page 17, https://issuu.com/casamagazine/docs/10.30.2020.voice_32_20pg?fr=sNmFmMzEwNjgw
 microreview & interview: The Book of Mirrors by Yun Wang, https://thefridayinfluence.com/2021/09/03/microreview-interview-the-book-of-mirrors-by-yun-wang/
 "Poet/astrophysicist ponders time and our role in the universe in 'The Book of Mirrors'", https://www.post-gazette.com/ae/books/2021/10/26/Yun-Wang-poetry-Book-of-Mirrors-book-review/stories/202110190155
 "Interview With Scientist, Professor & Poet Yun Wang", https://china-underground.com/2022/03/09/interview-with-scientist-professor-poet-yun-wang/
 "I Was Born to This Poetry": The Book of Mirrors by Yun Wang, https://therumpus.net/2022/08/24/i-was-born-to-this-poetry-the-book-of-mirrors-by-yun-wang/

External links
Yun Wang's biography on the Poetry Foundation website
Yun Wang's home page at California Institute of Technology

American cosmologists
American women physicists
Chinese women poets
Poets from Guizhou
Living people
University of Oklahoma faculty
1964 births
Members of the Eurasian Astronomical Society
People from Zunyi
Educators from Guizhou
Scientists from Guizhou
Tsinghua University alumni
Carnegie Mellon University alumni
21st-century American physicists
Fellows of the American Physical Society